Rosa 'Frensham' is a dark red Floribunda rose cultivar, developed by Albert Norman in 1942 and introduced into Britain by Harkness Roses in 1946 as 'Frensham'. It was awarded the RNRS Gold Medal by the Royal National Rose Society (RNRS) in 1943.

Description
'Frensham' is a medium-sized, vigorous bushy floribunda rose, 4 ft (121 cm) in height, with a 3 ft (91 cm) plant spread. The rose has a medium (9-16 petals) semi-double bloom form with 2–3 in (3-5 cm) flowers, typically borne in clusters. 'Frensham' has  a mild fragrance with a bloom color of dark red. The rose blooms in flushes from spring to fall. The foliage is dark green and shiny, and the plant has many thorns and prickles. 'Frensham' is susceptible to mildew.

History
'Frensham' was developed by amateur rose breeder, Albert Norman, in 1942. A family friend of Bill Harkness of Harkness Roses, Norman was a diamond cutter by profession. He is also known for developing 'Ena Harkness', 'Vera Dalton' and 'Anne Elizabeth'. Norman developed the rose by through a combination of: Rosa 'Edith Cavell' x (Rosa 'Edgar Andrew'  ×  Rosa 'Crimson Glory'). The new rose cultivar was introduced into Britain as "Frensham' by (Harkness Roses in 1946. The family nursery, which continues to sell roses today, was established in 1879 in Bedale, Yorkshire by brothers, John Harkness (1857-1933) and (Robert Harkness (1851-1920). 'Frensham' was used to develop the rose cultivar, Rosa 'Columbine' (Poulsen, 1956). The rose was awarded the RNRS Gold Medal in 1943.

References

Frensham
1946 introductions